Kani Rash or Kani Resh may refer to:
 Kani Rash, Kermanshah
 Kani Rash, Bukan, West Azerbaijan Province
 Kani Rash, Mahabad, West Azerbaijan Province
 Kani Rash, Oshnavieh, West Azerbaijan Province
 Kani Rash, Sardasht, West Azerbaijan Province
 Kani Rash, Urmia, West Azerbaijan Province